Kauerdluksoak Bay is a long narrow inlet or bay in Labrador at .

At its mouth is the site of the former Hebron mission station.

References

Bays of Newfoundland and Labrador